Praseodymium(III) nitride is a binary inorganic compound of praseodymium and nitrogen. The compound forms black crystals, and reacts with water.

Synthesis
Reaction of nitrogen and metallic praseodymium on heating:

Reaction of ammonia and praseodymium metal on heating:

Properties
Praseodymium nitride forms black crystals of a cubic system. The space group is Fm3m, with cell parameter a = 0.5165 nm, Z = 4, its structure similar to that of sodium chloride (NaCl).

The compound is readily hydrolyzed with water and reacts with acids.

Applications
The compound is used in high-end electric and semiconductor products, and as a raw material to produce phosphor. Also it is used as a magnetic material and sputtering target material.

References

Nitrides
Praseodymium compounds
Inorganic compounds
Rock salt crystal structure